The Aharonov–Casher effect is a quantum mechanical phenomenon predicted in 1984 by Yakir Aharonov and Aharon Casher, in which a traveling magnetic dipole is affected by an electric field. It is dual to the Aharonov–Bohm effect, in which the quantum phase of a charged particle depends upon which side of a magnetic flux tube it comes through. In the Aharonov–Casher effect, the particle has a magnetic moment and the tubes are charged instead.  It was observed in a gravitational neutron interferometer in 1989 and later by fluxon interference of magnetic vortices in Josephson junctions.  It has also been seen with electrons and atoms.

In both effects the particle acquires a phase shift while traveling along some path P. In the Aharonov–Bohm effect it is

While for the Aharonov–Casher effect it is

The effects have been observed together.

References

Bibliography

See also
 Duality (electricity and magnetism)

Quantum mechanics
Physical phenomena